Interfor may refer to:

 Interfor Corporation, the lumber producer
 Interfor International LLC., an international investigation firm offering comprehensive domestic and foreign intelligence services